Rainy River District is a district and census division in Northwestern Ontario in the Canadian province of Ontario. It was created in 1885. It is the only division in Ontario that lies completely in the Central Time Zone, except for the township of Atikokan (including Sapawe and Kawene to the east) observing Eastern Standard Time year-round. Its seat is Fort Frances. It is known for its fishing and its location on the US border opposite International Falls, Minnesota, and Baudette, Minnesota.

In 2016, the population was 20,110.

Subdivisions

Municipalities

Unorganized area
 Rainy River, Unorganized (served by the Eva Marion Lake local services board)

First Nations reserves

 Agency 1
 Assabaska
 Big Grassy River 35G
 Big Island 31D
 Big Island 31E
 Big Island 31F
 Big Island 37
 Big Island Mainland 93
 Couchiching 16A
 Lake of the Woods 31H
 Lake of the Woods 34
 Long Sault 12
 Manitou Rapids 11
 Naongashing 31A
 Neguaguon Lake 25D
 Rainy Lake 17A
 Rainy Lake 17B
 Rainy Lake 18C
 Rainy Lake 26A
 Sabaskong Bay 35C
 Saug-a-Gaw-Sing 1
 Seine River 23A
 Seine River 23B

Demographics

Culture 
As of 2013, the Rainy River District School Board has partnered with the Seven Generations Education Institute, the Ministry of Education, and local First Nations communities in development of new technologies and programs for revitalization of the Ojibwe language.

See also
 List of Ontario Census Divisions
 Quetico Provincial Park
 List of townships in Ontario
 List of secondary schools in Ontario#Rainy River District

External links 
 Rainy River District Social Services Administration Board

References